Portage Township is one of the nineteen townships of Wood County, Ohio, United States.  The 2010 census found 1,614 people in the township.

Geography
Located in the center of the county, it borders the following townships:
Center Township - north
Freedom Township - northeast corner
Montgomery Township - east
Perry Township - southeast corner
Bloom Township - south
Henry Township - southwest corner
Liberty Township - west
Plain Township - northwest corner

Two villages are located in Portage Township: part of Jerry City in the south, and part of Portage in the northwest.

Name and history

Portage Township was established in 1832. Statewide, other Portage Townships are located in Hancock and Ottawa counties.

Government
The township is governed by a three-member board of trustees, who are elected in November of odd-numbered years to a four-year term beginning on the following January 1. Two are elected in the year after the presidential election and one is elected in the year before it. There is also an elected township fiscal officer, who serves a four-year term beginning on April 1 of the year after the election, which is held in November of the year before the presidential election. Vacancies in the fiscal officership or on the board of trustees are filled by the remaining trustees.

The Portage Township House is located at the intersection of Huffman and Mermill roads.

References

External links
County website

Townships in Wood County, Ohio
Townships in Ohio